Sabrina (Sabrina Fair/La Vie en Rose in the United Kingdom) is a 1954 American romantic comedy-drama film directed by Billy Wilder, adapted for the screen by Wilder, Samuel A. Taylor and Ernest Lehman from Taylor's 1953 play Sabrina Fair. The picture stars Humphrey Bogart, Audrey Hepburn and William Holden. This was Wilder's last film released by Paramount Pictures, ending a 12-year business relationship between him and the company.

In 2002, the film was selected for preservation in the United States National Film Registry by the Library of Congress as being "culturally, historically, or aesthetically significant".

Plot

Sabrina Fairchild is the young daughter of the Larrabee family's chauffeur, Thomas, and has been in love with David Larrabee all her life. David, a three-times-married, non-working playboy, has never paid romantic attention to Sabrina. Since she has lived for years on the Larrabees' Long Island, New York, estate with her father, to him she is still a child.

Eavesdropping on a party at the mansion the night before she is to leave to attend the Le Cordon Bleu cooking school in Paris, Sabrina watches, follows, and listens as David entices yet another woman into a dark and vacant indoor tennis court. Distraught, she leaves her father a suicide note and then starts all eight cars in the closed garage in order to kill herself. She is passing out from the fumes when Linus, David's older brother, opens the door, discovers her, and carries her back to her quarters above the garage when she does pass out.

After two years in Paris, Sabrina returns home an attractive, sophisticated woman. When her father is delayed from picking her up at the station, flirtatious David, passing by, offers her a lift without recognizing her. She accepts.

Once David realizes who she is, he is quickly drawn to Sabrina and invites her to join him at a party at the mansion, and then later invites her to the indoor tennis court. When Linus sees this, he fears that David's imminent marriage to Elizabeth Tyson may be endangered. If that engagement were broken it would ruin a profitable opportunity for a great corporate merger between Larrabee Industries and Elizabeth's very wealthy father's business. Instead of confronting David about his irresponsibility, Linus pretends to sympathize with him. Linus manipulates David to sit down on champagne glasses he has placed in his pockets, and David is incapacitated for a few days.

Linus now takes David's place with Sabrina on the pretext that “it’s all in the family.” Linus and Sabrina fall in love, though neither will admit it. Linus’s plan is to pretend to accompany Sabrina back to Paris on an ocean liner but then not join her on the ship, getting her away from David, the family, and the now-threatened merger. However, when Linus instead confesses these intentions to Sabrina, she is hurt but understands the logic of the tactic. She agrees to sail the next day to live in Paris, but without Linus's offered money and other inducements.

The following morning Linus has second thoughts, and decides to send David to Paris with Sabrina. This means calling off David's wedding with Elizabeth and the big Tyson deal, and Linus schedules a meeting of the Larrabee board to announce this. David doesn't sail, and enters the meeting room at the last minute. He shows that he will marry Elizabeth after all, and helps Linus recognize his own feelings for Sabrina by insulting her and letting Linus punch him in the face. Linus, who has already arranged a car and a tugboat to wait for David, assists him to rush off and joins Sabrina's ship before it leaves the harbor. Linus seeks out Sabrina on board after providing an inside-joke hint that he is there, and they sail away to Paris together.

Cast

Production

Initially, Cary Grant was considered for the role of Linus, but he declined, and the role was taken by Bogart. Best known for playing tough detectives and adventurers, Bogart was cast against type as a smart businessman gradually transformed into a romantic lead.

During production of the film, Hepburn and Holden entered into a brief but passionate and much-publicized love affair. Bogart had originally wanted his wife Lauren Bacall to be cast as Sabrina. He complained that Hepburn required too many takes to get her dialogue right and pointed out her inexperience.

Bogart was unhappy during the filming, convinced that he was totally wrong for this kind of film, mad at not being Wilder's first choice, and not liking Holden or Wilder.  But Wilder's offbeat casting produced a performance that critics generally considered successful. Bogart later apologized to Wilder for his behavior on set, citing problems in his personal life. 

Wilder began shooting before the script was finished, and Lehman was writing all day to complete it. Eventually he would finish a scene in the morning, deliver it during lunch, and filming of it would begin in the afternoon.

Although Edith Head won an Oscar for Best Costumes, most of Hepburn's outfits are rumored to have been created by Hubert de Givenchy and chosen personally by the star. In a 1974 interview, Head stated that she was responsible for creating the dresses, with inspiration from some Givenchy designs that Hepburn liked, but that she made important changes, and the dresses were not by Givenchy. After Head's death, Givenchy stated that Sabrina's iconic black cocktail dress was produced at Paramount under Head's supervision but claimed it was his design.

The film began a lifelong association between Givenchy and Hepburn. It has been reported that when Hepburn called on Givenchy for the first time in Paris, he assumed that it was Katharine Hepburn in his salon.

The location used to portray the Larrabee family's mansion in Glen Cove, New York was 'Hill Grove', the home of George Lewis in Beverly Hills, California. This mansion was later demolished during the 1960s. The location used to portray the Glen Cove train station was the Glen Cove train station on the Oyster Bay Branch of the Long Island Rail Road. The building at 30 Broad Street in Manhattan's financial district was used as the location for the headquarters of the Larrabee company.

Reception
The film opened in New York and Los Angeles on September 23, 1954 and was number one at the US box office for two weeks. Bosley Crowther, writing for The New York Times on its original release, lauded the film, thinking it, "in our wistful estimation, the most delightful comedy-romance in years". Crowther also offered praise to Audrey Hepburn's performance, declaring "she is wonderful in it — a young lady of extraordinary range of sensitive and moving expressions within such a frail and slender frame".

Critical reception to Sabrina has been uniformly positive. James Berardinelli gave it 3 out of 4 stars and thought that it "will leave almost all viewers, even those as cold as Linus, with a smile on their lips and a warm glow in their hearts". Variety noted that "the Script is long on glibly quipping dialog, dropped with a seemingly casual air, and broadly played situations. The splendid trouping delivers them style. Leavening the chuckles are tugs at the heart." On film aggregator site Rotten Tomatoes, 93% of critics have given the film a positive review, with an average of 7.8/10. The critical consensus reads "With its humorous script and its stars' immense charm, Sabrina remains a resonant romantic gem."

Awards and nominations

Remakes
There have been Indian adaptations of the film. Manapanthal (1961) was a Tamil version, followed in the same year by a Telugu version, Intiki Deepam Illale. In addition Sabrina was the inspiration for the successful Hindi film Yeh Dillagi (1994), although with some changes to the plot. Sabrina was remade in Turkish as Şoförün Kızı in 1965. In 1995  there was a Hollywood remake from Paramount Pictures.

References

Further reading
  (Candid photographs of Audrey, on and off the set, taken by Mark Shaw for Life magazine during production of the film.)
  (Life article on Hepburn including some of the photos from the Sabrina set.)

External links

 
 
 
 
 
 
 Reel Classics page includes a Sabrina poster and Hepburn's photo from the film

1954 films
1954 comedy-drama films
1954 romantic comedy films
1954 romantic drama films
1950s romantic comedy-drama films
American black-and-white films
American films based on plays
American romantic comedy-drama films
1950s English-language films
Films about social class
Films directed by Billy Wilder
Films set in country houses
Films set in Long Island
Films set in New York (state)
Films set in Paris
Films shot in Los Angeles
Films shot in New York City
Films that won the Best Costume Design Academy Award
Films with screenplays by Billy Wilder
Films with screenplays by Ernest Lehman
Paramount Pictures films
United States National Film Registry films
1950s American films